Lorenzo Sauli (1535 in Genoa – 1601 in Genoa) was the 82nd Doge of the Republic of Genoa.

During his dogate Sauli had to face firsthand the issue related to the Marquisate of Finale, a small western Ligurian state linked to the Del Carretto family, and always in the expansionist aims of Genoa for its strategic and economic importance. The dogate ceased on 21 February 1601. Lorenzo Sauli died assassinated in the same year by Genesio Gropallo, son of a wool weaver, who under the dogate of Agostino Doria was beheaded together with his cousin Gio Girolamo Rosso considered his accomplice.

See also 

 Republic of Genoa
 Doge of Genoa

Sources 

 Buonadonna, Sergio. Rosso doge. I dogi della Repubblica di Genova dal 1339 al 1797.

16th-century Doges of Genoa
1535 births
1601 deaths
17th-century Doges of Genoa